"Rosebud" is the fourth episode of the fifth season of the American animated television series The Simpsons. It first aired on the Fox network in the United States on October 21, 1993. In the episode, Mr. Burns misses his childhood teddy bear Bobo on the eve of his birthday. After flashbacks reveal Bobo's journey through history, the bear ends up in the hands of Maggie Simpson. Burns does everything in his power to get Bobo back.

"Rosebud" was directed by Wes Archer and written by John Swartzwelder. It was the first episode to be executive-produced by David Mirkin, who was the show runner for the fifth and sixth seasons of the show. Supervising director David Silverman describes the episode as "one of the more challenging ones" to direct. The Ramones (Joey Ramone, Johnny Ramone, C. J. Ramone and Marky Ramone) guest-star in the episode as themselves. The episode is largely a parody of the 1941 film Citizen Kane and the title references Charles Foster Kane's dying word "Rosebud". The episode also contains references to The Wizard of Oz, Planet of the Apes, George Burns, Charles Lindbergh, The Rolling Stones and Adolf Hitler.

Critical reaction to "Rosebud" was largely positive and in 2003 Entertainment Weekly placed the episode in fourth place on their list of the 25 best episodes of The Simpsons.

Plot
Smithers overhears Mr. Burns having a nightmare in which he murmurs the name "Bobo". A flashback reveals that as a child, Burns lived with his family and cherished his teddy bear Bobo, which he dropped in the snow when he left home to live with a "twisted, loveless billionaire". Burns tells Smithers that he desperately misses Bobo but has no idea where it is.

Burns is so obsessed with finding Bobo that he cannot enjoy the elaborate birthday celebration Smithers arranges for him. After the Ramones' sneering version of "Happy Birthday" and Homer's crude comedy routine offend him, Burns angrily orders Smithers to have the Ramones killed (mistakenly calling them the Rolling Stones) and have his security guards break up the party by beating the guests.

Another flashback reveals Bobo's history: the bear finds its way to Charles Lindbergh, who brings it aboard the Spirit of St. Louis and throws it into a crowd after his transatlantic flight to Paris, where it is caught by Adolf Hitler. In 1945, Hitler blames Bobo for losing World War II and tosses it away. Bobo is seen again in 1957 on board the USS Nautilus headed for the North Pole. Bobo becomes encased in a block of ice harvested by an ice-gathering expedition in 1993. A bag of ice with Bobo inside is shipped to the Kwik-E-Mart in Springfield. Bart buys the bag, finds Bobo inside and gives it to Maggie as a toy.

Burns orders Smithers to find Bobo. When Homer realizes Maggie's new toy is Bobo, he negotiates a deal with Burns to exchange it for "a million dollars and three Hawaiian islands. The good ones, not the leper one." After Maggie refuses to give up Bobo, Homer defends his daughter and sends Burns away. He is outraged and promises vengeance unless he gets Bobo back.

After several failed attempts to steal the bear, Burns subjects Homer to harsh work at the nuclear power plant. He even goes as far as hijacking all of the television channels and cutting off Springfield's beer supply until Homer gives Bobo to him. An angry mob of townspeople soon attempt to take the bear away but are coaxed into giving it back to Maggie when they see her sad face. Finally, Burns forces Smithers to literally beg Homer for Bobo. Homer tells Burns that it belongs to Maggie now, but she refuses to give up Bobo even after Burns attempts to take it from her. Seeing how distraught Burns is, Maggie lets him have the bear. He is overcome with joy and promises to be nice to everyone — a vow he soon states under his breath he will remember.

In an epilogue set in the year one million A.D., the Earth has been reduced to a post-apocalyptic desert ruled by intelligent apes who unearth a fossilized Bobo. Burns — with his head in a jar attached to a cybernetic body — snatches Bobo from an ape and vows to never again leave the bear behind. Smithers — his head atop a robotic dog's body — follows Burns into the sunset.

Production
"Rosebud" was written by John Swartzwelder and was the first episode to be executive produced and run by David Mirkin. Mirkin enjoyed working on the episode so much that he spent "an enormous amount of time on post production" experimenting with various elements of the episode. Originally, the backstory for Bobo included several much darker scenes, including one where the bear was involved in the assassination of John F. Kennedy. The scenes were cut because the writers felt it was in bad taste. The ending of the episode was originally longer, but two segments were cut. The first saw Washington D.C. destroyed by invading Canadian troops, who found Bobo. The second featured the entire planet being overrun by giant redwoods and spotted owls.

David Silverman describes the episode as "one of the more challenging ones" to direct.
Guest stars The Ramones were "gigantic obsessive Simpsons fans" and their characters were designed by Wes Archer. Marky Ramone later called their appearance "a career highlight".

Cultural references

The episode is largely a parody of the 1941 Orson Welles film Citizen Kane. The title is a reference to Charles Foster Kane's dying word "Rosebud"; the teddy bear Bobo is a substitute for Rosebud in this episode, even down to the fact that Burns discards it in the snow when offered a new life of riches and power. The scene where he drops a snow globe while whispering the name of his lost toy also parodies Kane's death scene at the start of the film. The guards outside Mr. Burns's manor chant and march similarly to the Wicked Witch of the West's guards from the 1939 film The Wizard of Oz. The last scene where Mr. Burns's robotic body runs off with Bobo is a reference to the film Planet of the Apes in which herds of humans are enslaved by humanoid apes. Burns and Smithers' attempt to steal Bobo from the Simpsons mirrors Mission: Impossible, and their sitcom is similar to The Honeymooners. Both Mr. Burns and Homer make references to the cancellation of the TV series The Misadventures of Sheriff Lobo. Mr. Burns' brother is revealed to be comedian George Burns, and both Charles Lindbergh and Adolf Hitler were once in possession of Bobo.

Reception

Critical reception
In 2003, Entertainment Weekly's placed "Rosebud" second on their top 25 The Simpsons episode list, writing that "despite being one of The Simpsons most spectacularly overstuffed episodes, "Rosebud" has plenty of heart". IGN ranked The Ramones's performance as the fifteenth best guest appearance in the show's history.

In 2007, Vanity Fair named it the best episode of the show, calling it, "A perfect episode. Mr. Burns's lamentations for his childhood bear, Bobo, lead to a show-long parody of Citizen Kane. At once a satire and a tribute, the episode manages to both humanize Mr. Burns and delve deep into Homer's love for his oft-forgotten second daughter, Maggie."

In 2019, Time ranked the episode tenth in its list of 10 best Simpsons episodes picked by Simpsons experts.

In his book Planet Simpson, author Chris Turner listed "Rosebud" as one of his five favorite episodes of The Simpsons, calling the episode "genius". He added that the Ramones gave "possibly the finest guest musical performances ever."

The episode's reference to Citizen Kane was named the 14th greatest film reference in the history of the show by Total Film's Nathan Ditum.

When The Simpsons began streaming on Disney+ in 2019, former Simpsons writer and executive producer Bill Oakley named this one of the best classic Simpsons episodes to watch on the service.

David Silverman and Matt Groening describe the sequence where Homer eats 64 slices of American cheese as "one of the most hilarious segments ever done".

Ratings
In its original American broadcast, "Rosebud" finished 33rd in the ratings for the week of October 18–24, 1993. It acquired a Nielsen rating of 11.9. The episode was the second highest-rated show on the Fox network that week after Married... with Children.

References

Bibliography

External links

The Simpsons (season 5) episodes
1993 American television episodes
Ramones
Television shows written by John Swartzwelder
Parody television episodes
Parodies of films